Scanners: The Showdown (also known as Scanner Cop II) is a 1995 American science fiction film directed by Steve Barnett. It is the sequel to Scanner Cop and the fifth film in the Scanners series.  Daniel Quinn returns as a psychic police officer who searches for a serial killer who targets other psychics.

Plot
Sam Staziak, a Los Angeles police officer who happens to be a Scanner (a person with extraordinary telepathic and telekinetic power), tracks a renegade Scanner, Karl Volkin. Volkin, a recent escapee of a mental hospital, is building his power by siphoning off the power of other weaker Scanners.

After Staziak puts Volkin in prison, as well as killing Volkin’s brother after they broke into a home, Volkin swears to take the power out of Staziak, as well as killing him in revenge.

During an investigation into the deaths of a number of Scanners, Staziak realizes who is committing the atrocities, thanks to a sketch given to Staziak by his friend, Carrie Goodart, who has just survived an attack by Volkin. Being a Scanner herself, Goodart was looking for Staziak’s mother, Rachel Staziak, when Volkin broke into the institute where she was working, which provoked her to try scanning him. Unfortunately, it was a futile effort, as she took Ephemerol regularly – a drug created in the 1940s to ease pregnancy pain and discomfort. Its main side effect, however, was that it created Scanners. Scanners could take the drug as a suppressant, which would prevent a Scanner from going insane, while also dampening their power. Volkin scanned her in retaliation, forcing her to end her own scan. He uses his powers to connect with the institution’s computer to look up the location of any known Scanners in the area.

While hunting Scanners, Volkin decides to kill Staziak’s mother, knowing it would cause Staziak a great deal of psychological pain. However, before he could, she jumps off of her porch, ending her own life. Upon hearing the news of his mother’s death, Staziak is devastated, and decides to take care of Volkin, once and for all. The two meet in a warehouse, and after a long battle of mind power, Staziak takes the upper hand and causes Volkin’s head to explode.

Release
The film was released on VHS by Republic Pictures in May 1995. A DVD has been released in Canada with its predecessor.

Reception 
TV Guide rated the film 2/5 stars and called it "entertaining exploitation fare", though the review criticized the emphasis put on gory special effects.  Writing for Bloody Disgusting, Daniel Baldwin wrote that it is not as good as Scanner Cop but is still entertaining for its gore and performances.  Leonard Maltin's capsule review calls it an "effective, entertaining sequel".

Further reading

References

External links
 

1995 films
1995 horror films
1990s action horror films
1990s science fiction horror films
American sequel films
Scanners (film series)
American action horror films
Films about telekinesis
1990s English-language films
1990s American films